William Thomas Smedley (March 26, 1858March 26, 1920), was an American artist born in Chester County, Pennsylvania, of a Quaker.

He worked at a newspaper, then studied engraving and art in Philadelphia, in the Pennsylvania Academy of the Fine Arts, and—after making a tour of the South Seas—in Paris under Jean-Paul Laurens. He settled in New York City in 1880; in 1882 went with the Marquis of Lorne through Canada, preparing sketches for Picturesque Canada. He also provided wood engravings that appeared as illustrations in The Picturesque Atlas of Australasia (1886).

In 1905 he became a member of the National Academy of Design.

Most of his work was magazine and book illustration for stories of modern life, but he painted portraits and watercolours, and received the Evans Prize of the American Watercolor Society in 1890, and a bronze medal at the Paris Exposition of 1900.

Smedley died in Bronxville, New York on 26 March 1920.

Gallery

References

Works
 The Mystery of Francis Bacon (1912)

External links

 
 
 

1858 births
1920 deaths
19th-century American painters
19th-century American male artists
American male painters
20th-century American painters
Pennsylvania Academy of the Fine Arts alumni
Students of Thomas Eakins
20th-century American male artists